55 East Erie is an all-residential skyscraper in Chicago. Designed by Fujikawa Johnson & Associates and Searl & Associates Architects, the 56 story building was completed in 2004 and is the fourth-tallest all-residential building in the United States after Trump World Tower in New York City, One Museum Park in Chicago, and the nearby 340 on the Park completed in 2007 in Chicago.

The design called for flying buttresses around the mechanical penthouse, which were eventually dropped. Early on, the building was envisioned as much taller in order to house a Mandarin Oriental hotel, but a deal was never struck.

55 East Erie has 194 residential units, including seven floors of split story penthouse homes. The building also features four “Skyhomes,” each a unique four story townhome with its own elevator. Amenities for residents include a swimming pool, fitness center, men's and women's locker rooms each with their own steam room, and a hospitality room.

See also
List of skyscrapers
List of tallest buildings in the United States
List of tallest buildings in Chicago
World's tallest structures

References
Emporis listing
55 East Erie Condominium Association Website
Sudler Property Management Website 

Residential skyscrapers in Chicago
Residential condominiums in Chicago
Residential buildings completed in 2004
2004 establishments in Illinois